The International Grand Prix Losail was a one-day road cycling race held in Qatar. Only one edition was held. It was part of UCI Asia Tour in category 1.2.

Winners

References

UCI Asia Tour races
Recurring sporting events established in 2008
Recurring sporting events disestablished in 2008
2008 establishments in Qatar
Cycle races in Qatar
Defunct cycling races in Qatar